Elections to Strabane District Council were held on 20 May 1981 on the same day as the other Northern Irish local government elections. The election used three district electoral areas to elect a total of 15 councillors.

Election results

Note: "Votes" are the first preference votes.

Districts summary

|- class="unsortable" align="centre"
!rowspan=2 align="left"|Ward
! % 
!Cllrs
! % 
!Cllrs
! %
!Cllrs
! %
!Cllrs
!rowspan=2|TotalCllrs
|- class="unsortable" align="center"
!colspan=2 bgcolor="" | DUP
!colspan=2 bgcolor="" | SDLP
!colspan=2 bgcolor="" | UUP
!colspan=2 bgcolor="white"| Others
|-
|align="left"|Area A
|bgcolor="#D46A4C"|35.4
|bgcolor="#D46A4C"|2
|17.2
|1
|25.2
|1
|22.2
|1
|5
|-
|align="left"|Area B
|bgcolor="#D46A4C"|30.9
|bgcolor="#D46A4C"|2
|24.3
|1
|27.3
|1
|17.5
|1
|5
|-
|align="left"|Area C
|7.0
|0
|27.3
|2
|8.5
|1
|bgcolor="#CDFFAB"|57.2
|bgcolor="#CDFFAB"|2
|5
|-
|- class="unsortable" class="sortbottom" style="background:#C9C9C9"
|align="left"| Total
|25.1
|4
|22.8
|4
|20.7
|3
|31.4
|4
|15
|-
|}

Districts results

Area A

1977: 2 x UUP, 1 x DUP, 1 x SDLP, 1 x Independent Nationalist
1981: 2 x DUP, 1 x UUP, 1 x SDLP, 1 x Independent Nationalist
1977-1981 Change: DUP gain from UUP

Area B

1977: 2 x UUP, 1 x DUP, 1 x SDLP, 1 x Independent Nationalist
1981: 2 x DUP, 1 x UUP, 1 x SDLP, 1 x Independent Nationalist
1977-1981 Change: DUP gain from UUP

Area C

1977: 3 x SDLP, 1 x UUP, 1 x Independent Nationalist
1981: 2 x SDLP, 2 x Independent Nationalist, 1 x UUP
1977-1981 Change: Independent Nationalist gain from SDLP

References

Strabane District Council elections
Strabane